Gilles Châtelet (2 February 1944 – 11 June 1999) was a French philosopher and mathematician.

Biography
Châtelet began studying at the École Normale Supérieure Fontenay-Saint-Cloud-Lyon in 1963. During the student upheavals of the late 1960s and the following years, he was a member of the Communist Party and associated with the Front homosexuel d'action révolutionnaire (FHAR). He became a gay activist due to his time in California in 1969, but went to the FHAR as a "way of finding again the ambiance of the United States." He later studied at  University of Paris XI where he obtained his PhD in pure mathematics on 20 December 1975 and wrote his thesis on differential topology.

Châtelet became a professor of mathematics in 1979 at the University of Paris VIII St. Denis (formally Known as the Free University of Vincennes). From 1981 to 1983 he was the scientific attaché at the French embassy in Israel. He was the program director at the International College of Philosophy from 1989 to 1995. He is known to have designed a seminar titled "Love Science Philosophy." In 1994 he joined the Laboratory of Thinking Science which was just founded by Charles Alunni where until his death he taught an influential seminar titled "Action, Power and Virtuality."

He died by suicide in Paris on 11 June 1999.

Selected works 
In 1986, he began writing for L'Autre until the journal's closure by its publisher Michel Butel in 1990.

In 1993 Éditions du Seuil published his book Les Enjeux du mobile, (Translated into English as Figuring Space) which was a study of mathematics, physics and philosophy. In this book, Châtelet tries to reflect on the perception of movement in philosophy, mathematics and physics by way of using concepts of virtuality and intensive quantities borrowed from Nicole Oresme and Gottfried Wilhelm Leibniz, He presents his conception of the deafening but complicated relationship between mathematics, physics and philosophy through a comparison between intuition and discourse, sense and speech.

Chatelet is well known in France for his political pamphlet Vivre et penser comme des Porcs, De l'incitation à l'envie et à l'ennui dans les démocraties-marchés,(1998) It was translated and published in English (November 2014) as To Live and Think Like Pigs: Envy and Boredom in Market-Economy Democracies.To Live and Think Like Pigs was a polemical essay in which he denounced liberalism which according to him its effectiveness relied on a triple alliance between the "tertiary" spheres of politics, economics and cybernetics, or communication technologies.

In a collection of his political writing titled Les Animaux malades (Sick Animals of Consensus), he rejected what he considered as a widespread human domestication process imposed by the New World Order. He called for a new philosophy to combat the disastrous effects of the decomposition of both the libertarian optimism and cynicism which in his opinion had become a pseudo-liberal sham.

Citation 
Quotation from To Think and Live Like Pigs: "To promote a work without its own temporality, totally indentured to the social order—whether it comes from the whip and from hunger for indentured labour, or from the mutilated psychology of the cyberzombie for the overclass—a work that cannot be articulated with an intensification of individuation for the great mass of humanity; in short, to content oneself with proliferating particular cases of a species: is this all that we can now hope for from humanity?"

References

1944 births
1999 suicides
20th-century French philosophers
Continental philosophers
20th-century French mathematicians
Topologists
French LGBT rights activists
University of Paris alumni
Academic staff of the University of Paris
Suicides in France
French male non-fiction writers
20th-century French male writers
1999 deaths